Protein chibby homolog 1 is a protein that in humans is encoded by the CBY1 gene.

Function 

Beta-catenin is a transcriptional activator and oncoprotein involved in the development of several cancers. The protein encoded by this gene interacts directly with the C-terminal region of beta-catenin, inhibiting oncogenic beta-catenin-mediated transcriptional activation by competing with transcription factors for binding to beta-catenin. Two transcript variants encoding different isoforms have been found for this gene.

Interactions 

CBY1 has been shown to interact with Beta-catenin. CBY1 has also been shown to interact with CEP164, CIBAR1 (FAM92A1), and RAB8A.

References

External links

Further reading